Top Model is a Brazilian telenovela produced and aired in the 7pm timeslot by Rede Globo, from September 18, 1989 to May 4, 1990. It had 197 chapters. It replaced Que Rei Sou Eu? and was followed by Mico Preto.

Plot
Maria Eduarda "Duda" Pinheiro is a successful top model. After being hired to model Covery brand clothes, she meets the Kundera brothers, Alex and Gaspar, owners of the company.

Gaspar, a former beatnik, is over 40 but still practices surfing, lives in a beachside house and raises five children: Elvis (named after Elvis Presley), Ringo (Starr), Jane (Fonda), Olívia (Newton-John) and (John) Lennon, all from different mothers who left them with him.  Anastácia "Naná" Passos, Duda's friend and mentor, loves him platonically, and rivalizes with Mariza Borges (mother of Gaspar's latest son, whom she named Alex Jr., however) over him.

Alex by contrast is a yuppie. He and their mother Morgana have a love-hate relationship and rivalizes with his brother over Morgana's attention and the company.

Alex begins to love Duda, however she falls in love with Lucas, a graffiti artist who is on the run from the São Paulo police due to his involvement in a crime there. He is also searching for his real father, and thinks it's either Alex or Gaspar.

Cast

References

External links

1989 Brazilian television series debuts
1990 Brazilian television series endings
1989 telenovelas
TV Globo telenovelas
Brazilian telenovelas
Portuguese-language telenovelas